Gabensis is a village in Wampar Rural LLG, Morobe Province, Papua New Guinea. It lies to the north-west of Lae,  from Oomsis. In 1999 it had a population of about 1700 people. There is a stream flowing in the vicinity of the same name, Gabensis Creek.

References

External links
Map of villages in the area

Populated places in Morobe Province